Ambalapattu is a name common to several villages located in Orathanadu taluk, Thanjavur district, Tamil Nadu, India.

The 2011 India census has separate records for Ambalapattu North, Ambalapattu South and Ambalapattu South Sivakollai.

Demographics

Ambalapattu North
As of the 2011 India census, the population was 3554, of those 1628 are male and 1926 female.

Ambalapattu South
As of the 2011 India census, the population was 2302, of those 1070 are male and 1232 female.

Ambalapattu South Sivakollai
As of the 2011 India census, the population was 1581, of those 782 are male and 799 female.

References

Villages in Thanjavur district